The Stade Municipal de Péronnas is a football stadium in Péronnas, Rhône-Alpes, France. It is the current home of FC Bourg-Péronnas. It has a capacity of 3,610.

References

Football venues in France
Sports venues in Ain